East Moreton was an electoral district of the Legislative Assembly in the Australian state of Queensland from 1860 to 1878, also known as Moreton from 1874 to 1878.

The district took in the south-east corner of the state, south of Brisbane and Ipswich. It was a dual member electorate from 1860 to 1873 and a single member electorate from 1873 to 1878.

Members

By-election in February 1870
On 17 February 1870, Arthur Francis, member for East Moreton, resigned due to insolvency, and a by-election was called. On the nomination day, 19 February 1870, there were two candidates Robert Travers Atkin and Robert Cribb (who had previously represented the electorate from 1863 to 1867). In his nomination speech, Atkin made accusations against Cribb, who replied vigorously defending himself. The somewhat unexpected outcome of this verbal exchange was that Cribb announced he would withdraw his nomination. Cribb said that if Atkin believed he could represent them so well, the best thing they could do would be to let him try, predicting that Atkin would either resign or be asked to resign within six months. Being the only remaining candidate, Atkin was declared elected.

Cribb's six-month prediction did not come true. However, Atkin did not complete his term, as he resigned on 7 March 1872 due to serious ill health (pulmonary tuberculosis) from which he died a few months later on.

See also
 Electoral districts of Queensland
 Members of the Queensland Legislative Assembly by year
 :Category:Members of the Queensland Legislative Assembly by name

References

Former electoral districts of Queensland
1860 establishments in Australia
1878 disestablishments in Australia
Constituencies established in 1860
Constituencies disestablished in 1878